Germany national under-20 football team, also known as Germany Under-20s or Germany U20(s), represents Germany in association football at an under-20 age level and is controlled by German Football Association, the governing body for football in Germany.

Because there is no under-20 competition at UEFA level, Germany's under-20 side has generally only played competitive matches when it has qualified for the FIFA U-20 World Cup, which is held every 2 years. Since the 2017–18 season, Germany also contest the Under 20 Elite League, winning the inaugural season.

Competitive record

Current squad
 The following players were called up for the 2022–23 Under 20 Elite League matches.
 Match dates: 16, 19 and 22 November 2022
 Opposition: ,  and 
 Caps and goals correct as of: 26 September 2022, after the match against 

Records

FIFA U-20 World Cup
 Winner (19811)
 Runners-up (19871)

Notes
1 = as West Germany
2 = as East Germany

Under 20 Elite League
 Winner (2017–18)

Awards

FIFA U-20 World CupIndividual Silver Ball: Michael Zorc (1981)
 Bronze Ball: Roland Wohlfarth (1981), Marcel Witeczek (1987)
 Golden Shoe: Marcel Witeczek (1987)
 Silver Shoe: Ralf Loose (1981), Roland Wohlfarth (1981)
 Bronze Shoe: Marc Stendera (2015)Team FIFA Fair Play Award: 1987

Under 20 Elite LeagueIndividual'''
 Top scorer: Robin Hack (2017–18)

See also
 Germany national football team
 Germany national under-21 football team
 East Germany national under-21 football team
 FIFA U-20 World Cup
 FIFA U-17 World Cup
 UEFA European Under-19 Championship
 UEFA European Under-17 Championship

References

External links
 Germany Youth National Teams

Youth football in Germany
Football
European national under-20 association football teams